Thổ Hà is a village in Việt Yên District, Bắc Giang Province, northeastern Vietnam.

References

Populated places in Bắc Giang province